M Hafizuddin Khan is a Bangladeshi career bureaucrat,6th Comptroller and Auditor General of Bangladesh and former adviser to the caretaker government heading the Ministries of Finance, Planning, Jute and Textiles.

Early life
Khan completed his B.A. and M.A. in political science from Dhaka University in 1961. He obtained a diploma in Development Finance from the University of Birmingham.

Career
Khan joined the Central Civil Service of Pakistan in 1964 as an Audit and Accounts cadre.He served in the railway Accounts Service and  Defence Finance Department.He was placed in the senior service pool of the Government of Bangladesh in 1977. He served in BASIC Bank Limited and Rupali Bank as a director. He was the chairman of Agrani Bank. He also did a stint in the Prime Minister's Secretariat. He was the 6th Comptroller and Auditor General of Bangladesh. He retired in 1999 from Government service. He served as an adviser in the caretaker government, Latifur Rahman Cabinet. He was in charge of the  Ministries of Finance, Planning, Jute and Textiles with the rank of minister. He is the chairperson of the Board of Trustees of Transparency International Bangladesh. He is the vice-president of Anjuman Mofidul Islam. He is the founder-chairman of a civil society organization named Citizens for Good Governance (SHUJAN). He is a director of MIDAS Financing Limited.

References 

Living people
People from Sirajganj District
Advisors of Caretaker Government of Bangladesh
Bangladeshi economists
Bangladeshi social workers
University of Dhaka alumni
Alumni of the University of Birmingham
Year of birth missing (living people)